Dongfeng Honda Automobile Co., Ltd. is an automobile manufacturing company headquartered in Wuhan, China, and a 50:50 joint-venture between Dongfeng Motor Group and Honda Motor Company. It currently produces a variety of Honda models also available in other markets and a handful of China-only products. The company sells vehicles under the Honda and Ciimo marques.

According to Honda, the total production capacity for the two plants of Dongfeng Honda in Wuhan, were 480,000 units, yearly. However, Dongfeng Motor Group reported that 713,840 units were produced by Dongfeng Honda in 2017.

History
Dongfeng Honda was established in July 2003 and began automobile production in April 2004 with the Honda CR-V sport utility vehicle.

In February 2006, Dongfeng Honda completed a 2.8 billion yuan (US$340 million) expansion of its production facility quadrupling production capacity to 120,000 units. In May 2008, it announced plans to double production capacity to 240,000 vehicles a year with an investment of 10 billion RMB.

As of 2011, product part-content included parts manufactured in Japan.

Operations
As of 2016, Dongfeng Honda has two completed production bases and a third planned. The as-yet-unbuilt factory will be situated near its 2004 and 2012 production bases in Wuhan, Hubei.

Products
Its product line includes or has included the below vehicles:

Current

Ciimo

Ciimo is a sub-marque of Dongfeng Honda launched in April 2012 and aimed at first-time car buyers. It markets a rebadged eight-generation Honda Civic featuring the design of the Japanese market model. The Ciimo brand's second product is the X-NV, which is a rebadged Honda XR-V featuring slightly restyled front end design and clear tail lamps.
X-NV (2019–present)
M-NV (2021-present)

Honda
CR-V (2004–present)
Civic (2006–present)
Elysion (2012–present)
Envix (2019–present)
Inspire (2018–present)
Life (2020–present)
UR-V (2017–present)
XR-V (2014–present)
e:NS1 (2021–present)

Discontinued 
Spirior (2009–2018)
Gienia (2016–2019)
Greiz (2015–2019)
Jade (2013–2020)

Gallery

See also
List of Honda assembly plants
Guangqi Honda

Notes

References

External links
 Official site of Dongfeng-Honda

Car manufacturers of China
Motor vehicle assembly plants in China
Honda factories
Vehicle manufacturing companies established in 2003
Chinese companies established in 2003
Dongfeng Motor joint ventures